Jeassy, also known as J. C. or Jesey, was an Indian director and actor of Malayalam movies. His first film as an actor 
was Ramu Kariat's Ezhu Rathrikal. Some of his notable films as an actor were Adimakal, Kallichellamma, Allahu Akbar, Manpeda, Kuttyedathi and Ganga Sangamam. Shapamoksham, made in 1974, was his first film as a 
director. Since the early 1970s, he has directed some 30 movies.

Filmography

Director

Shapamoksham (1974)
Aswathy (1974)
Chandanan Chola (1975)
Sindhooram (1976)
Agni Pushpam (1976)
Rajaankanam (1976)
Veedu Oru Swargam (1977)
Aval Viswasthayayirunnu (1978)
Aarum Anyaralla (1978)
Thuramukham (1979)
Rakthamillatha Manushyan (1979)
Ezhunirangal (1979)
Puzha (1980)
Pavizha Mutthu (1980)
Dooram Arike (1980)
Akalangalil Abhayam (1980)
Aagamanam (1980)
Thaaraavu (1981)
Oru Vilippadakale (1982)
Ethiraalikal (1982)
Nizhal Moodiya Nirangal (1983)
Orikkal Oridathu (1985)
Eeran Sandhya (1985)
Akalathe Ambili (1985)
Adukkan Entheluppam (1986)
Neeyethra Dhanya (1987)
Ivide Ellavarkkum Sukham (1987)
Purappadu (1990)
Sarovaram (1993)
Sankeerthanam Pole (1997)

Actor

Asthram(1983)
Allahu Akbar(1977)
Oru Sundariyude Katha (1972)...Georgekutty
Kuttyedathi(1971)
Gangaasangamam (1971)
Manpeda  (1971)
Ernakulam Junction(1971)
Jalakanyaka (1971)
Rathrivandi (1971)
Ara Nazhika Neram (1970)
Nizhalattam (1970)
Kallichellamma (1969)
Adimakal (1969) .... Ananthan
Ezhu Rathrikal (1968)
Bhoomiyile Malakha  (1965)

Screenplay
Thaaraavu  (1981)
Shapamoksham (1974)
Aswathy (1974)
Azhimukham  (1972)
Bhoomiyile Malakha (1965)

Dialogue
Shapamoksham (1974)
Azhimukham (1972)
Bhoomiyile Malakha (1965)

Story
Agni Pushpam (1976)

Tele films
Mohapaskhikal 
Kuthirakal

External links

http://www.malayalachalachithram.com/profiles.php?i=2004

Malayalam film directors
1936 births
2001 deaths
Indian male film actors
Male actors from Kochi
Malayalam screenwriters
Male actors in Malayalam cinema
Film directors from Kochi
20th-century Indian film directors
20th-century Indian dramatists and playwrights
Screenwriters from Kochi
20th-century Indian male actors
20th-century Indian screenwriters